Vellinga is a surname. Notable people with the surname include:

Pier Vellinga (born 1950), Dutch scientist
Renske Vellinga (1974–1994), Dutch speed skater